Pierrette Bloch (June 16, 1928 – July 7, 2017) was a Paris-born Swiss painter and textile artist.

Early life
Pierrette Bloch was born on June 16, 1928 in Paris. In 1939, Bloch and her parents left France for Switzerland to escape the war. At the age of 15, she began living on her own in a hotel, which she says helped foster very early on a complete sense of independence and autonomy. She began her professional artistic training at the end of the 1940s, taking courses in the plastic arts in Paris.

Career
Bloch began exhibiting her works in Paris and the United States in the 1950s. The ensemble of her works have their roots in the use of  "poor" materials such as ink, paper, mesh, and horsehair. The last of these, horsehair, began appearing in her work in the 1970s, with her first sculpture using horsehair created in 1979, and have become one of the key symbols of her work. The corpus of her work thus spans mediums, including drawings, collages and three-dimensional pieces, and falls into the category of postwar abstraction. Her work has been exhibited in Europe, Asia, and the Americas.

A monograph on Pierrette Bloch was published in November 2013 by Musée Jenisch.

Death
Bloch died on July 7, 2017 in Paris at the age of 89.

Biography 
 1947-48 - Studying with Henri Goetz and André Lhote.
 1949 - Becomes friends with Colette and Pierre Soulages.
 1951 - Has first solo exhibitions in Paris at Galerie Mai, and also exhibits at Harvard in the United States.
 1953 - Starts creating collages.
 1973 - Chains first begin appearing in her body of work.
 1984 - Begins using horsehair in her works. The hair was at the time purchased without clear intentions, but became clear in her artistic path.
 1994 - First paper lines.
 2005 - The foundation Pro-MAHJ awards le prix Maratier 2005 to Pierrette Bloch for the ensemble of her works.

Key exhibitions 
 1999 - Retrospective at the Musée de Grenoble.
 2002 - Exhibition at the Cabinet d’art graphique of Centre Pompidou.
 2003 - Exhibition at the Picasso Museum, Antibes.
 2009 - Exhibition at Musée Fabre, Montpellier.
 2010 - Participated in the exhibition On line du MOMA, New York.

Public collections 
 Museum of Modern Art, New York, USA.
 Musée Bellerive, Zurich, Suisse.
 Musée National d'Art Moderne, Centre Georges Pompidou, Paris, France.
 Musée d'Art Moderne de la Ville de Paris, Paris, France.
 Fonds National d'Art Contemporain, Paris, France.
 Musée d'Eilat, Israël.
 Stedelijk Museum, Amsterdam, Pays-Bas.

Quotations 
« J’entreprends un long voyage sur une feuille, je m’enveloppe dans ce parcours; ce n’est plus une surface, mais une aventure dans le temps. Le format n’existe plus. » ("I undertake a long voyage on a sheet of paper, I envelop myself in the journey; it's no longer a surface, but an adventure in time. The format of the work ceases to exist.")

References 

 See M.J. Bonnet, "Les femmes artistes dans les avant-gardes", O. Jacob, 2006

External links 

  « Pierrette Bloch » sur l'encyclopédie audiovisuelle de l'art contemporain
  "Pierrette Bloch ou l'abstraction poetique" on Le Nouvel Obs
  "Portraits de femmes artistes: Pierrette Bloch" on ina.fr
  "Oeuvres recentes de Pierrette Bloch" on Artistik Rezo
  "Pierrette Bloch" on France Culture

1928 births
2017 deaths
Artists from Paris
20th-century French Jews
Jewish artists
French emigrants to Switzerland
Women textile artists